Ahmad Syiha  Buddin (born 5 April 2001) is an Indonesian professional footballer who plays as a centre-back for Liga 1 club PSIS Semarang.

Club career

PSIS Semarang
He was signed for PSIS Semarang to play in Liga 1 in the 2021 season. Syiha made his professional debut on 6 February 2022 in a match against Persik Kediri at the Kapten I Wayan Dipta Stadium, Gianyar.

Career statistics

Club

References

External links
 Syiha Buddin at Soccerway

2001 births
Living people
Indonesian footballers
Association football central defenders
Liga 1 (Indonesia) players
PSIS Semarang players
People from Jepara
Sportspeople from Central Java